The Khanzadas of Mewat were a dynasty of chiefs from Rajputana who had their capital at Alwar. The Khanzadas were Muslim Rajputs Mev who descended from Raja Sonpar Pal who was a Yaduvanshi Rajput who  converted to Islam during the period of the Delhi Sultanate in India.

Mewat was spread over a wide area, it included Hathin tehsil, Nuh district, Tijara, Gurgaon, Kishangarh Bas, Ramgarh, Laxmangarh Tehsils Aravalli Range  in Alwar district and Pahari, Nagar, Kaman tehsils in Bharatpur district of Rajasthan and also some part of Mathura district of Uttar Pradesh.

History
In 1372, Firuz Shah Tughlaq granted the Lordship of Mewat to Raja Nahar Khan, (who was formerly known as Raja Sonpar Pal, of Kotla). Raja Nahar Khan established a hereditary polity in Mewat and proclaimed the title of Wali-e-Mewat. Later his descendants affirmed their own sovereignty in Mewat. They ruled Mewat till 1527.

Downfall
The last Khanzada Rajput ruler of Mewat was Hasan Khan Mewati, who died in the Battle of Khanwa. Following this battle, Mewat was integrated into the Mughal Empire and the Khanzadas became a part of the Mughal nobility.

Rulers of Mewat
The Khanzada Rajputs rulers of Mewat State adopted the title  "Wali-e-Mewat". The title was later changed to "Shah-e-Mewat" by Hasan Khan Mewati in 1505.

Descendants

In the following centuries, the Khanzadas were reduced to the status of zamindars. Many continued to serve in the Alwar State Forces and British Indian Army. Khanzadas are Gorwal Rajputs Gotra. However, the Chowdhurys' of Tijara and Nawabs of Shahabad, Alwar remained important Khanzadas strongholds. Among them Nawab Feroz Khan of Shahabad, Alwar and Khan Bahadur Fateh Naseeb Khan of Tijara, Alwar achieved Imperial chivalry ranks. After the Partition of India in 1947, majority Khanzadas of Mewat migrated to Pakistan in these Districts: Karachi,Hederabad,Nawabshah,

Larakana,kasur and Narowal.

See also
Muslim Rajputs

References

History of Rajasthan
Muslim dynasties of India
Mewat